Welcome Beach is a settlement in British Columbia located North-West of Vancouver on the West coast of Canada.

According to the 2016 Canadian Census, Welcome beach has a population of 1125.

References 

Populated places in the Sunshine Coast Regional District